Personality and Individual Differences is a peer-reviewed academic journal published 16 times per year by Elsevier. It was established in 1980 by Pergamon Press and is the official journal of the International Society for the Study of Individual Differences. The editors-in-chief are Peter K. Jonason, Julie Aitken Schermer, Aljoscha Neubauer, Michelle Yik and Colin Cooper. Previous editors include Donald H. Saklofske, Philip A. Vernon, Gísli Guðjónsson and Sybil B. G. Eysenck. The founding editor was Hans Jürgen Eysenck. The journal covers research about the structure of personality and other forms of  individual differences, the processes which cause these individual differences to emerge, and their practical applications.

Abstracting and indexing
The journal is abstracted and indexed in:

According to the Journal Citation Reports, the journal has a 2021 impact factor of 3.951.

Notable paper
In 1985 the journal published "A revised version of the psychoticism scale", which described a revised version of the Eysenck Personality Questionnaire. This paper has been cited over 1600 times.

Retraction
On 17 June 2020 Elsevier announced it was retracting a 2012 article by J. Philippe Rushton and Donald Templer. The article falsely claimed that there was scientific evidence that skin color was related to aggression and sexuality in humans.

See also
2010 conservatism-psychoticism correlation error

References

External links

Differential psychology journals
Elsevier academic journals
English-language journals
Personality journals
Publications established in 1980
Race and intelligence controversy
Social psychology journals